Midas Mbabane City FC is a Eswatini soccer club based in Mbabane. They were relegated from the Premier League in Eswatini in 2017–18.

Stadium
Currently the team plays at the 20000 capacity Somhlolo National Stadium.

References

External links
Soccerway

Football clubs in Eswatini
Mbabane